KTPA may refer to:

 The ICAO airport code for Tampa International Airport
 KTPA (AM), a defunct radio station (1370 AM) licensed to Prescott, Arkansas, United States